The United States Army Medical Research Directorate-Africa (USAMRD-A) — previously known as the "U.S. Army Medical Research Unit-Kenya (USAMRU-K)" — is a "Special Foreign Activity" of the Walter Reed Army Institute of Research headquartered in Nairobi, Kenya. The unit was established in 1969 and operates under a cooperative agreement with the Kenya Medical Research Institute. Much of the research done there has focused on tropical diseases, such as malaria, trypanosomiasis, and leishmaniasis, as well as arboviruses, HIV/AIDS, and other emerging infectious diseases. USAMRD-A serves as the headquarters for a network of research laboratories across Africa.

See also
United States Army Medical Research Unit-Brazil (USAMRU-B)
United States Army Medical Research Unit-Europe (USAMRU-E)
Makerere University Walter Reed Project (MUWRP)

References

External links
 USAMRU-K Public Website

Kenya
Research institutes in Kenya
Medical and health organisations based in Kenya
Military units and formations established in 1969
Kenya–United States relations